Ocimum tenuiflorum, commonly known as holy basil, tulsi or tulasi, and tamole, damole, or domole in Fiji, is an aromatic perennial plant in the family Lamiaceae. It is native to the Indian subcontinent and widespread as a cultivated plant throughout the Southeast Asian tropics.

Tulsi is cultivated for religious and traditional medicine purposes, and also for its essential oil. It is widely used as a herbal tea, commonly used in Ayurveda, and has a place within the Vaishnava tradition of Hinduism, in which devotees perform worship involving holy basil plants or leaves.

The variety of Ocimum tenuiflorum used in Thai cuisine is referred to as Thai holy basil ( kaphrao) and is the key herb in phat kaphrao, a stir-fry dish; it is not the same as Thai basil, which is a variety of Ocimum basilicum. In Cambodia, it is known as mreah-prov.

Morphology

The purplish flowers are placed in close whorls on elongated racemes.

The three main morphotypes cultivated in India and Nepal are Ram tulsi (the most common type, with broad bright green leaves that are slightly sweet), the less common purplish green-leaved (Krishna or Shyam tulsi) and the common wild vana tulsi (e.g., Ocimum gratissimum).

Origin and distribution
DNA barcodes of various biogeographical isolates of tulsi from the Indian subcontinent are now available. In a large-scale phylogeographical study of this species conducted using chloroplast genome sequences, a group of researchers from Central University of Punjab, Bathinda, have found that this plant originates from North-Central India.

This basil has now escaped from cultivation and has naturalised into a cosmopolitan distribution.

Chemical composition 
Some of the phytochemical constituents of tulsi are oleanolic acid, ursolic acid, rosmarinic acid, eugenol, carvacrol, linalool, and β-caryophyllene (about 8%).

Tulsi essential oil consists mostly of eugenol (~70%) β-elemene (~11.0%), β-caryophyllene (~8%), and germacrene (~2%), with the balance being made up of various trace compounds, mostly terpenes.

Genome sequence
The genome of the tulsi plant has been sequenced and reported as a draft, estimated to be 612 mega bases, with results showing genes for biosynthesis of anthocyanins in Shyama Tulsi, ursolic acid and eugenol in Rama Tulsi. The predicted proteins and other annotations are available from caps.ncbs.res.in/Ote.

Uses
Tulsi (Sanskrit: Surasa) has been used in Ayurvedic and Siddha practices for its supposed medicinal properties.

Thai cuisine
 
The leaves of holy basil, known as kaphrao in the Thai language, are commonly used in Thai cuisine for certain stir-fries and curries such as phat kaphrao — a stir-fry of Thai holy basil with meats, seafood or, as in khao phat kraphao, with rice. Two different types of holy basil are used in Thailand, a "red" variant which tends to be more pungent, and a "white" version for seafood dishes. Kaphrao should not be confused with horapha, which is normally known as Thai basil, or with Thai lemon basil (maenglak).

Insect repellent
For centuries, the dried leaves have been mixed with stored grains to repel insects.

Nematicidal
The essential oil may have nematicidal properties against Tylenchulus semipenetrans, Meloidogyne javanica, Anguina tritici, and Heterodera cajani.

Disinfection
Water disinfection using O. tenuiflorum extracts was tested by Bhattacharjee et al 2013 and Sadul et al 2009. Both found an alcoholic extract to be more effective than aqueous or leaf juice. Sundaramurthi et al 2012 finds the result to be safe to drink and antimicrobial. A constituent analysis by Sadul found alkaloids, steroids, and tannins in the aqueous, and alkaloids and steroids only in the alcoholic extract.

Significance in Hinduism

Tulsi is a sacred plant for Hindus, particularly the Vaishnavite sect. It is worshipped as the avatar of Lakshmi, and is often planted in courtyards of Hindu houses or temples to Hanuman. The ritual lighting of lamps each evening during Karthik includes the worship of the tulsi plant. Vaishnavites are also known as "those who bear the tulsi around the neck".

Tulsi Vivah is a ceremonial festival performed between Prabodhini Ekadashi (the 11th or 12th lunar day of the bright fortnight of the Hindu month of Kartik) and Kartik Purnima (the full moon of the month).

Every evening, Bengali Hindus place earthen lamps in front of tulsi plants. During the Kati Bihu festival celebrated in Assam, people light earthen lamps (diya) at the foot of the household tulsi plants and pray.

Gallery

See also
 Sacred trees
 Sacred groves

References

External links

Herbs
tenuiflorum
Plants used in Ayurveda
Flora of tropical Asia
Plants described in 1753
Indian spices
Taxa named by Carl Linnaeus